Denys Zacharopoulos (born 1952 in Athens, Greece) is an art historian and theorist. He works as Professor of Art History, author, and curator, amongst others at the 48th Biennale in Venice (Italy) and documenta IX in Kassel (Germany).

Biography 
Denys Zacharopoulos studied music in Athens and from 1970 in France literature, semantics and philosophy, followed by history and sociology of the arts and in literature. His teachers were Jean Cassou, Gaëtan Picon, Louis Marin and Roland Barthes. He lived in France and became a French citizen. Since 2000, he has lived in Greece.

In 1975, Denys Zacharopoulos became program coordinator of the Institute of Contemporary Arts in London, England. He then spent time in New York and taught as Professor in the Academies of Fine Arts in Geneva, Vienna, and Amsterdam.

During this period he forged intensive personal contacts to many contemporary artists of his generation, in particular to James Welling, Matt Mullican, Ernst Caramelle, Jean-Marc Bustamante, Juan Muñoz, Thomas Schütte and Reinhard Mucha.

Professional activities 
Denys Zacharopouls' first major works centered on the Arte Povera movement. He curated a long series of exhibitions in major museums in Europe and the United States. Since 2001, he has published extensively and curated intensively many exhibitions on the artistic production and the issue of Avantgarde in Greece in the second half of the 20th century.

Director of the Domaine de Kerguehennec, in France (1992–1999)
Co-Director with Jan Hoet of documenta IX in Kassel, Germany (1992)
General inspector for contemporary art in the French Ministry for Culture (1999)
 Curator of the French Pavilion at the 48th Biennale in Venice (1999)
 Visiting Professor at the École Supérieure des Arts Visuels (ESAV) in Geneva (1985-1991)
 Professor at the Rijksakademie van Beeldende Kunsten in Amsterdam, the Netherlands (1996–2005)
Professor for art history and art theory at the Aegean University in Lesvos, Greece (2002-2010)
Artistic director of the Macedonian Museums for Contemporary Art, Thessalonica (2006).

Publications 
Since 1977, Zacharopoulos has produced art critiques in: Artforum (New York); Artistes (Paris); Arti (Athens); Parkett (Zurich); Furor (Geneva); Faces (Geneva); Museumjournal (Amsterdam);  Art e Dossier (Rome); Artstudio (Paris); Juliett (Trieste); Acrobat Mime Parfait (Bologna); Teuchos  and Artime (both Athens).

Numerous catalogues and theoretical publications listed in Zacharopoulos'  bibliography, with particular emphasis on the following artists: Gerhard Richter, Mario Merz, Gilberto Zorio, Iannis Kounellis, Per Kirkeby, Eugene Leroy, Michelangelo Pistoletto, Pat Steir, Carl Andre, Pierpaolo Calzolari, Jean-Pierre Bertrand, Marina Abramović, Lothar Baumgarten, Marisa Merz, Jean-Marc Bustamante, Matt Mullican, Thomas Schütte, Jan Vercruysse, Helmut Dorner, Geylan Gerber,[Harald Klingelhöller, Franz West, Jim Lutes, Tadashi Kawamata, Reinhard Mucha, Adrian Schiess, Herbert Brandl, Jimmy Durham, Michel François, Eran Schaerf,  Xavier Noiret-Thomé.

Bibliography
Denys Zacharopoulos/Ulrich Look, "Gerhard Richter", S. Schreiber, Munich, 1984
 "Reinhard Mucha: Das Figur/Grund Problem in der Architektur des Barocks", Kunstverein, Stuttgart 1985.
"Per Kirkeby", Musée Saint-Pierre, Lyon, 1987
"Gerhard Richter", Liliane & Michel Durand-Dessert, Paris 1991.
"Jean-Marc Bustamante", Kröller-Müller, Otteloo, 1994
"Per Kirkeby", Arts Club, Chicago, 2007
"Xavier Noiret-Thomé", Analogues, maison d'édition pour l'art contemporain, Arles, 2013

Awards and honors
 Chevalier des Arts et des Lettres of the French Republic
 Austrian Cross of Honour for Science and Art (2002)

References

1952 births
Living people
Writers from Athens
Greek art historians
Greek art curators
Chevaliers of the Ordre des Arts et des Lettres
Recipients of the Austrian Cross of Honour for Science and Art